Give Kids The World Village is an 89-acre nonprofit resort in Kissimmee, Florida that provides critically ill children and their families with week-long wish vacations at no cost.

Half of all critically ill children eligible for a wish choose to visit Central Florida and its theme parks. Give Kids The World aims to fulfill that wish, providing children and their families with all-inclusive vacations including transportation, accommodations, food, theme park tickets, and entertainment. Give Kids The World has accommodated nearly 177,000 families from all 50 U.S. states and 76 countries throughout its history, and has been given a four-star rating from Charity Navigator for 15 years in a row, a rating in the top 1% of U.S. charities.

History
Give Kids The World was founded by Henri Landwirth.  Born in Antwerp, Belgium, Henri spent five years in the Auschwitz and Matthausen concentration camps  during World War II. By the war's end, both of his parents had been killed, but Henri and his twin sister, Margot, survived and were reunited. Henri then immigrated to America on a freight ship. He was soon drafted into the U.S. Army and served during the Korean War.  After his service, Henri used the GI Bill to study hotel management while working the night desk at Manhattan's Wellington Hotel.

In 1954, he moved to Florida and began managing the 100-room Starlite Motel. This was followed by him opening a franchised Holiday Inn in Orlando.

In the 1980's, Henri began offering complimentary hotel rooms to children with life-threatening illnesses who wished to visit Walt Disney World. One day, Henri noticed that a reservation for a young girl named Amy, who had leukemia, had been cancelled. While he had donated the accommodations, the other travel arrangements had taken too long, and Amy died before she could make the trip. Heartbroken, Henri vowed to never let a child's wish go unfulfilled.

In 1986, with the support of multiple partners and individuals, Henri founded Give Kids The World Village.  The Village now encompasses 89 acres, 166 private wish family villas, and an array of accessible rides, attractions and venues.

The Village

The Village encompasses 166 private storybook villas, four accessible rides and attractions, including the Enchanted Carousel, the Jurassic Junction (JJ's) train experience, Kelly's Sunny Swing and Lori's Magical Flight, the Gingerbread House Restaurant, the Serendipity pirate-themed entertainment stage, two wheelchair accessible pools, Jack's Wacky WaterWorks splash pad, horseback riding, a nature trail, gardens and koi pond, Henri's Starlite Scoops, a space-themed accessible ice cream parlor, Jersey Jaxson's Playroom, Julie's Safari Theater, Matthew's Boundless Playground (featuring the world's largest game of Candy Land), Amberville Train Station, the Happy Harbor Fishing Pond, a chapel, and the Castle of Miracles (where the stars of every child who has visited are displayed on the ceiling). During a typical year, volunteers fill approximately 1,800 volunteer shifts each week.

Wish program

Children between the ages of 3 and 18 who have been diagnosed with a critical illness by a licensed doctor are eligible for a Give Kids The World wish. More than 250 wish-granting organizations around the world determine the eligibility of each child and work with Give Kids The World to arrange each wish.

References

External links

Buildings and structures in Kissimmee, Florida
Children's charities based in the United States
Resorts in Florida
Tourist attractions in Osceola County, Florida
1989 establishments in Florida